Adam Skórnicki (born 22 October 1976 in Wolsztyn, Poland) is a former motorcycle speedway rider from Poland.

Career

Skórnicki started racing in Poland for Unia Leszno in the 1994 Polish Speedway First League; he would spend six seasons with the club until the end of 1999. Skórnicki's first British club was Wolverhampton Wolves, whom he signed for in 2000. He had six successful years there, scoring over 1000 points for the club and winning the Elite League Championship in 2002. His averaged improved from 5.79 in 2000 to 8.14 in 2005.

He was loaned out to Lakeside, Oxford and Belle Vue for the next three seasons, all of whom struggled at the bottom of the Elite League table. In 2002 Skórnicki made a guest appearance for the Poole Pirates in two legs  of the Craven Shield Final. Skórnicki signed for Poole on loan in 2008 and went on to win the 2008 Elite League championship with the club. 

In August 2008, Skórnicki became the Individual Polish Champion for the first time with a 15-point maximum score.

For the 2009 season, Skórnicki returned to his parent club the Wolverhampton Wolves in the United Kingdom. He also changed clubs in Poland and Sweden, to Gdańsk (in the Ekstraliga) and Vargarna respectively. For Wolves he became a regular points scorer and was intergal during the 2009 Elite League speedway season, when Wolves won the league title, giving Skórnicki his second consecutive title.

In 2010, he remained with Wolves and returned to Poznań from Gdańsk. It was his 17th consecutive season in the Polish leagues. He rode for various British and Polish clubs from 2012 to 2014 before retiring. 

In June 2014, he was appointed as a manager of Unia Leszno

In 2017, he made a brief return, riding a handful of matches for his first British club Wolves and Kolejarz Rawicz in Poland.

References

1976 births
Living people
Polish speedway riders
European Pairs Speedway Champions
Polish speedway champions
Belle Vue Aces riders
Lakeside Hammers riders
Oxford Cheetahs riders
Poole Pirates riders
Wolverhampton Wolves riders
People from Wolsztyn
Sportspeople from Greater Poland Voivodeship